The Scandinavian Journal of Statistics is a quarterly peer-reviewed scientific journal of statistics. It was established in 1974 by four Scandinavian statistical learned societies. It is published by John Wiley & Sons and the editors-in-chief are Sangita Kulathinal (University of Helsinki), Jaakko Peltonen (University of Tampere) and Mikko J. Sillanpää (University of Oulu). According to the Journal Citation Reports, the journal has a 2021 impact factor of 1.040, ranking it 97th out of 125 journals in the category "Statistics & Probability".

References

External links

Wiley (publisher) academic journals
Quarterly journals
Statistics journals
English-language journals
Publications established in 1974